The Independence Champs were a Class-D minor league baseball team based in Independence, Kansas that played in the Oklahoma–Arkansas–Kansas League in 1907. Multiple notable players spent time with the team, including Chick Brandom, Drummond Brown, Dick Crutcher, Danny Friend and Marc Hall.

Timeline

References

Baseball teams established in 1907
Defunct minor league baseball teams
Independence, Kansas
Defunct baseball teams in Kansas
Baseball teams disestablished in 1907
1907 establishments in Kansas
1907 disestablishments in Kansas